Lotta may refer to:

 Lotta (name), a diminutive name of Charlotte and  Charlotta
 Lotta (river), a river in northern Finland and Murmansk Oblast, Russia

Other
 Lotta Svärd, Finnish paramilitary organization of World War II
 Lotta Svärd (poem), epic poem
 Lotta Continua Italian paramilitary organization
 Lotta Comunista, Italian political party
 Lake Lotta, American lake
 Lotta in Love, 2006 telenovela
 "Lotta på Liseberg", Swedish sing-a-long

See also

Lota (name)
Alfred J. Lotka
Latta (disambiguation)
Litta (disambiguation)
Lotha (disambiguation)
Losta (disambiguation)
Lota (disambiguation)
Lott (disambiguation)
Lotte (disambiguation)
Lotto (disambiguation)
Lotts (disambiguation)
Lotti (given name)
Lotty

Swedish feminine given names